The Pacific-slope flycatcher (Empidonax difficilis) is a small insectivorous bird of the family Tyrannidae.  It is native to coastal regions of western North America, including the Pacific Ocean and the southern Gulf of California, as far north as British Columbia and southern Alaska, but is replaced in the inland regions by the Cordilleran flycatcher.  These two species were classified as a single species, commonly called the western flycatcher, by the American Ornithologists’ Union until 1989.  In winter, both species migrate south to Mexico, where they are virtually indistinguishable from one another.

Description

In plumage, the Pacific-slope flycatcher is virtually identical to the Cordilleran flycatcher, and differs only subtly from most Empidonax flycatchers in North America, but its breeding habitat and call are different. Its call can vary slightly by different regions and the bird itself.

Habitat
The Pacific-slope flycatcher inhabits either coniferous or deciduous forests. In its range it enters mixed woods, Douglas fir forests, redwood forests, and many other wooded environments including riparian woodlands.
As of November 2019, there has been one case of these West Coast birds showing up on the East Coast, in Palmyra, New Jersey.

Diet
As a flycatcher it will wait on a perch and when it sees a flying insect it will chase it without any apparent effort. They also enter swarms of gnats, mosquitos and wherever such insects congregate. They fulfill an important role in keeping insect populations in check, particularly mosquitoes, and they also eat caterpillars and spiders.

References

External links
 
 Videos, photos, and sounds at the Internet Bird Collection
 Pacific-slope flycatcher at USGS
 Pacific-slope flycatcher photo gallery VIREO
 Article with photos at Bob Steele Phoptography

Pacific-slope flycatcher
Birds of Mexico
Pacific-slope flycatcher
Fauna of the California chaparral and woodlands
Native birds of Alaska
Native birds of the Northwestern United States
Native birds of the West Coast of the United States
Native birds of Western Canada
Pacific-slope flycatcher